Where Butterflies Don't Fly is the name of the feature film based on the original screenplay by Roman Němec. The main roles are performed by the theater actor Daniel Krejčík as a nineteen-year-old student grammar school student and Jiří Vojta as his teacher. The movie
premiered on May 16, 2022. The story takes place in Kadaň and cave complexes.

Plot 
Daniel is an odd guy who lives with his endlessly quarrelling parents uncomplaining about his destiny. He keeps a distance from other people, he has no friends, nobody understands him, he is different. He will be turning nineteen and the last thing he would spend his time on is a preparation for his approaching graduation.

Adam is his classteacher. He is gay who lives in a relationship with his younger partner David and his strictly guarded secret keeps locked behind a door of their apartment.

Daniel and Adam live in their own bubbles until a moment when they both happen to be together in life threat. Lost in the darkness, cut off from the rest of the world, they are both looking for a way out. How far will they be willing to go?

Cast 
 Daniel Krejčík - Daniel
 Jiří Vojta - Adam
 Jaroslav Dušek - The school head
 Simona Babčáková - Teacher Stehlíková
 Klára Melíšková - Daniel's mother
 Martin Myšička - Daniel's father
 Jakub Krejča - David

References

External links

2020s Czech-language films
2022 drama films
2022 films
Czech adventure films
Czech drama films
Czech LGBT-related films